Panos G. Rontoyannis (Alternate spelling Rontogannis ; June 20, 1911 in Lefkas – December 26, 1996 in Athens) was a philologist-historian of Lefkas.

Main works
History of the Island of Lefkas, Vol 1(1980), Vol 2 (1982)
Education in Lefkas 1613-1950 (1994)
The Lefkadian Population from the Remote Past to 1991 (1994)
Seismologio of Lefkas 1469-1971 (1994)
Founder of the Public Library and the Museum of Post-byzantine Ecclesiastic Art of Lefkas (1953-1965)
Founder of the Association for Lefkadian Studies (1949)

References

1911 births
1996 deaths
People from Lefkada
20th-century Greek historians